Davis Library may refer to:

 Davis Library, branch of the Montgomery County Public Libraries system in Maryland
 Walter Royal Davis Library, main library of the University of North Carolina at Chapel Hill library system